Voyage, also known as Cruise of Fear, is a 1993 American adventure thriller television film directed by John Mackenzie and starring Rutger Hauer, Eric Roberts, and Karen Allen. It premiered on the USA Network on June 2, 1993.

Plot 
Morgan and Catherine Norvell have their future plans ready. In Monte Carlo, their sailboat is stocked. From there they are going to sail to Malta and live on the boat for a year. They have bought some real estate with an old ruin of a hotel on it, which they are going to rebuild. A few days before they are about to start, they meet Gil and Ronnie Freeland. They would give anything to join them for a couple of days on the sea, and no sooner said than done, all four of them are enjoying the sweet life on the boat. The Norvells soon discover that it was a big mistake to invite them on board...

Cast 
Rutger Hauer as Morgan Norvell
Eric Roberts as Gil Freeland
Karen Allen as Catherine 'Kit' Norvell
Connie Nielsen as Ronnie Freeland
Hazel Ellerby as Maria
Larry Powell as Business Man
Peter Baldacchino as Louis
Martin Corrado as First Bar Man
Joe Zarb Cousin as Second Bar Man
Phyllis Carlysle as First Woman Photographed
Sue Ellen Denisen as Second Woman Photographed
Betty Mitchell as Bar Client

References

External links

1993 television films
1993 films
1993 thriller films
1990s adventure thriller films
1990s American films
1990s English-language films
Adventure television films
American adventure thriller films
American thriller television films
Davis Entertainment films
Films directed by John Mackenzie (film director)
Films produced by John Davis
Films scored by Carl Davis
Films set in the Mediterranean Sea
Films shot in Malta
Seafaring films
USA Network original films